The women's 800 metre freestyle competition of the swimming events at the 2019 Pan American Games was held on 8 August 2019 at the Villa Deportiva Nacional Videna cluster.

Records
Prior to this competition, the existing world and Pan American Games records were as follows:

Results

Final
The final round was held on August 8.

References

Swimming at the 2019 Pan American Games
2019 in women's swimming